Chen Anyu (1922 – January 7, 2015) was a Chinese politician. 

Chen was born in Dinghai District, Zhoushan, Zhejiang. He was a delegate to the 6th National People's Congress and 7th National People's Congress. He was chairman of the People's Congress of his home province.

References

1922 births
2015 deaths
Delegates to the 6th National People's Congress
Delegates to the 7th National People's Congress
Mayors of Hangzhou
People's Republic of China politicians from Zhejiang
Chinese Communist Party politicians from Zhejiang
People from Zhoushan